Robert Proctor may refer to:

 Robert Proctor (bibliographer) (1868–1903), English bibliographer
 Robert Proctor (field hockey) (born 1949), Australian field hockey player 
 Robert N. Proctor (born 1954), American historian of science
 Bob Proctor (author) (1934-2022), Canadian self-help author

See also 
 Proctor (surname)